Lyall Woznesensky (born April 4, 1953) is a former Canadian football defensive lineman who played eight seasons in the Canadian Football League for six different teams.  In 2006, he became the defensive co-ordinator for the football program at John Barsby Community School in Nanaimo, British Columbia.

Woznesensky played college football for the Simon Fraser Clan.

References

1954 births
Living people
Canadian people of Ukrainian descent
Sportspeople from Melville, Saskatchewan
Players of Canadian football from Saskatchewan
Canadian football defensive linemen
Simon Fraser Clan football players
Winnipeg Blue Bombers players
Calgary Stampeders players
Hamilton Tiger-Cats players
Saskatchewan Roughriders players
Toronto Argonauts players
Montreal Concordes players